Lotte Mart is a South Korean hypermarket that sells a variety of groceries, clothing, toys, electronics, and other goods, with headquarters in South Korea. Lotte Mart is a division of the Lotte Co., Ltd. which sells food and shopping services in South Korea and Japan. Lotte Mart, part of the Korean conglomerate "Lotte", opened its first branch at Guui-dong, GangByeon, Seoul, Korea on April 1, 1998. In 2006, Lotte Mart opened its first overseas branch. As of August 8, 2011, Lotte Mart had 199 branches (92 branches in Korea, 82 branches in China, 23 branches in Indonesia, and 13 branches in Vietnam). The brands that Lotte created and sell include Herbon, Wiselect, Withone, Basicicon, Tasse Tasse, and Gerard Darel.

In April 2018, Lotte Mart confirmed to exit Beijing operations by selling its 21 Beijing stores to Chinese supermarket operator Wumei Holdings Inc.

Operating divisions

International locations

China
In December 2007, Lotte Mart bought out Makro, an established supermarket chain from the Netherlands. By purchasing Makro, Lotte Mart was able to gain access to the Chinese market. This was the first time Korean retail had entered the Chinese market. There are now 82 branches of Lotte Mart in China.

In February 2017, it was reported that Lotte Group had agreed to offer one of its golf course to be swapped with Korea military. The golf course was expected to be used as a site for Terminal High Altitude Area Defense (THAAD) to the US military.

Indonesia
Continuing their expansion plans, in October 2008, Lotte bought PT Makro Indonesia. PT Makro Indonesia, who operated Makro stores, ran 19 stores in Indonesia. This was also the first time Korean retail had entered the Indonesian market. As of 2019 there are 50 stores in Indonesia.

Vietnam
On December 18, 2008 Lotte Mart established its first Vietnamese branch in District 7 of Ho Chi Minh City.

Toys "R" Us
Lotte Mart made a licensed contract with Toys "R" Us in December 2007. The first Toys R Us opened in South Korea on December 8, 2007. It was opened in the  Lotte Mart Guro Branch in Seoul, Korea. Other Toys R Us locations are in Guri, Incheon, Samsan, and Jamsil. The Lotte Mart Company planned to open 20 more Toys R Us stores by 2012.

References

External links

 Offsite website in Korean
 Lotte Korea Group Official website 

Mart
Retail companies established in 1998
Department stores of China
Department stores of South Korea
Department stores of Indonesia
South Korean companies established in 1998